James L. Stoick (March 14, 1919 – October 16, 2004) was an American politician.

Born in 1914, Stoick worked as a grocer. He served three years in the South Dakota House of Representatives from 1975 to 1978. Stoick ran for the South Dakota Senate and was seated in 1979. He stepped down in 1992, and died in Mobridge, South Dakota on October 16, 2004, aged 85.

References

1919 births
2004 deaths
Republican Party members of the South Dakota House of Representatives
Republican Party South Dakota state senators
American grocers
People from Mobridge, South Dakota
20th-century American politicians